Mario Oliverio (born 4 January 1953 in San Giovanni in Fiore) is an Italian politician. From 2004 to 2012, he was president of the Province of Cosenza. He served as President of the Calabria region from 2014 to 2020. He is a member of the Democratic Party.

Biography

In 1980, at the age of 27, Oliverio was elected regional councilor of Calabria on the PCI list. In 1985 he was re-elected member of the Regional Council and a year later he was appointed agriculture assessor of the first left-wing government in the Calabria region chaired by Francesco Principe. From 1990 to 1991 he served as mayor of San Giovanni in Fiore.

Oliverio was also elected MP in the 1992, 1994, 1996 and 2001 general elections. From 2004 to 2014 he has served as President of the Province of Cosenza. In 2014 he has been elected President of the Calabria region, with the 61.4% of the preferences.

References

1953 births
Living people
Presidents of Calabria
Presidents of the Province of Cosenza
People from Cosenza
Italian Communist Party politicians
Democratic Party of the Left politicians
Democrats of the Left politicians
Democratic Party (Italy) politicians